Koloušek (feminine Koloušková) is a Czech surname. Notable people include:

 Lenka Koloušková (born 1967), Czech sport shooter
 Radim Koloušek (born 1941), Czech alpine skier
 Václav Koloušek (born 1976), Czech footballer

Czech-language surnames